KDAO-FM (99.5 FM, "Soft Rock 99.5") is a commercial radio station that serves the Marshalltown, Iowa and Eldora, Iowa area.  The station primarily broadcasts an adult contemporary music format.  KDAO-FM is licensed to Eldora Broadcasting Company, Inc which is owned by Dean L. Osmundson, Audrey G. Osmundson and Mark K. Osmundson.  The Osmundsons also own MTN Broadcasting, Inc., licensee of KDAO-AM and KDIT-CD, Marshalltown, IA.

The station also provides local news, weather and sports as well as national and worldwide news via its Fox News affiliation.

The transmitter and broadcast tower are located between Eldora and Marshalltown north of Union, Iowa.

References

External links
KDAO-FM website

DAO-FM
Mainstream adult contemporary radio stations in the United States